

Overall 
Only official matches included (Serie A, Italian Cup, Italian Super Cup, UEFA Champions League & UEFA Cup) matches

* Updated after A.C. Milan match on 14 November 2010

Atalanta B.C. 

 Most goals in a match
* More than 7 goals in single match
 9 goals on 25 March 1990 Inter 7-2 Atalanta
 7 goals on 31 May 2009 Inter 4-3 Atalanta

 Atalanta B.C. biggest wins
* Two or more goals difference, OR Atalanta scored three or above
 Inter 0-3 Atalanta on 22 February 1948
 Atalanta 3-1 Inter on 15 October 1967
 Inter 1-3 Atalanta on 12 January 1986
 Atalanta 3-1 Inter on 18 January 2009

 F.C. Internazionale Milano biggest wins
* Four or more goals difference, OR Inter scored five or above
 Atalanta 2-5 Ambrosiana Inter on 31 January 1943
 Inter 4-0 Atalanta on 8 May 1949
 Inter 4-0 Atalanta on 23 September 1951
 Atalanta 1-5 Inter on 25 September 1960
 Inter 6-0 Atalanta on 27 August 1961
 Atalanta 0-5 Inter on 2 October 1966
 Atalanta 0-4 Inter on 20 April 1969
 Inter 7-2 Atalanta on 25 March 1990
 Inter 4-0 Atalanta on 14 March 1998
 Inter 4-3 Atalanta on 31 May 2009

The following table lists the history of meetings between Inter and Atalanta, updated to the most recent match of 24 April 2010.

A.S. Bari 
The following table lists the history of meetings between Inter and Bari, updated to the most recent match of 22 September 2010.

Bologna F.C. 1909 
The following table lists the history of meetings between Inter and Bologna, updated to the most recent match of 30 August 2010.

Cagliari Calcio 
The following table lists the history of meetings between Inter and Cagliari, updated to the most recent match of 17 October 2010.

Brescia Calcio 
The following table lists the history of meetings between Inter and Brescia, updated to the most recent match of 6 November 2010	.

Calcio Catania 
The following table lists the history of meetings between Inter and Catania, updated to the most recent match of 12 March 2010.

A.C. ChievoVerona 
The following table lists the history of meetings between Inter and Chievo, updated to the most recent match of 9 May 2010.

ACF Fiorentina 
The following table lists the history of meetings between Inter and Fiorentina, updated to the most recent match of 13 April 2010.

U.S. Fiorenzuola 1922 
The following table lists the history of meetings between Inter and Fiorenzuola, updated to the most recent match of 25 October 1995.

Genoa C.F.C. 

The following table lists the history of meetings between Inter and Genoa, updated to the most recent match of 29 October 2010.

Juventus F.C. 

 Most goals in a match
* More than 7 goals in single match
 10 goals on 10 June 1961 Juventus 9-1 Inter
 9 goals on 14 December 1913 Juventus 7-2 Inter
 8 goals on 17 January 1932 Juventus 6-2 Ambrosiana Inter
 8 goals on 19 June 1975 Inter 2-6 Juventus in Coppa Italia
 7 goals on 26 November 1911 Inter 6-1 Juventus
 7 goals on 4 January 1913 Inter 6-1 Juventus

 F.C. Internazionale Milano biggest wins
* Four or more goals difference, OR Inter scored five or above
 Inter 6-1 Juventus on 26 November 1911
 Inter 6-1 Juventus on 4 January 1913
 Ambrosiana Inter 4-0 Juventus on 17 November 1935
 Ambrosiana Inter 5-0 Juventus on 16 October 1938
 Ambrosiana Inter 4-0 Juventus on 17 September 1939
 Inter 6-0 Juventus on 4 April 1954
 Inter 4-0 Juventus on 11 November 1979
 Inter 4-0 Juventus on 11 November 1984

 Juventus F.C. biggest wins
* Four or more goals difference, OR Juventus scored five or above
 Juventus 7-2 Inter on 14 December 1913
 Juventus 6-2 Ambrosiana Inter on 17 January 1932
 Juventus 4-0 Ambrosiana Inter on 17 May 1942
 Juventus 5-1 Inter on 3 March 1957
 Juventus 9-1 Inter on 10 June 1961
 Inter 2-6 Juventus on 19 June 1975 in Coppa Italia

The following table lists the history of meetings between Inter and Juventus, updated to the most recent match of 3 October 2010.

S.S. Lazio 

 Most goals in a match
* More than 7 goals in single match
 9 goals on 18 March 1934 Inter 8-1 Lazio
 8 goals on 18 October 1998 Inter 3-5 Lazio
 7 goals on 22 September 1957 Inter 5-2 Lazio
 7 goals on 5 March 1961 Inter 7-0 Lazio
 7 goals on 8 September 2000 Inter 3-4 Lazio in Supercoppa Italiana
 7 goals on 13 May 2007 Inter 4-3 Lazio

 SS Lazio biggest wins
* Three or more goals difference, OR Lazio scored four or above
 Lazio 4-2 Ambrosiana Inter on 2 June 1935
 Lazio 4-1 Inter on 14 May 1995
 Lazio 3-0 Inter on 22 February 1998
 Inter 3-5 Lazio on 18 October 1998
 Lazio 4-3 Inter on 8 September 2000 in Supercoppa Italiana
 Lazio 4-2 Inter on 5 May 2002

 F.C. Internazionale Milano biggest wins
* Four or more goals difference, OR Inter scored five or above
 Ambrosiana Inter 8-1 Lazio on 18 March 1934
 Ambrosiana Inter 4-0 Lazio on 19 May 1940
 Inter 5-2 Lazio on 22 September 1957
 Inter 4-0 Lazio on 7 June 1959
 Inter 7-0 Lazio on 5 March 1961
 Inter 4-0 Lazio on 19 November 1978
 Inter 5-2 Lazio on 27 January 1999 in Coppa Italia

The following table lists the history of meetings between Inter and Lazio, updated to the most recent match of 2 May 2010.

U.S. Lecce 

 Most goals in a match
* More than 6 goals in single match
 6 goals on 27 September 1997 Lecce 1-5 Inter
 6 goals on 21 November 1999 Inter 6-0 Lecce

 U.S. Lecce biggest wins
 Lecce 1-0 Inter on 26 March 2000
 Inter 1-0 Lecce on 11 December 2000
 Lecce 2-1 Inter on 2 May 2004

 F.C. Internazionale Milano biggest wins
* Four or more goals difference, OR Inter scored five or above
 Inter 5-0 Lecce on 20 January 1991
 Lecce 1-5 Inter on 27 September 1997
 Inter 5-0 Lecce on 15 February 1998
 Inter 6-0 Lecce on 21 November 1999

The following table lists the history of meetings between Inter and Lecce, updated to the most recent match of 10 November 2010.

A.S. Livorno Calcio 

 Most goals in a match
* More than 7 goals in single match
 8 goals on 23 February 1930 Inter 6-2 Livorno
 6 goals on 24 February 1935 Inter 5-1 Livorno
 6 goals on 7 March 1943 Livorno 4-2 Ambrosiana Inter

 A.S. Livorno Calcio biggest wins
* Three or more goals difference, OR Livorno scored four or above
 Livorno 3-0 Inter on 2 March 1923
 Livorno 3-0 Ambrosiana Inter on 29 March 1942
 Livorno 4-2 Ambrosiana Inter on 7 March 1943

 F.C. Internazionale Milano biggest wins
* Four or more goals difference, OR Inter scored five or above
 Inter 4-0 Livorno on 18 November 1923
 Ambrosiana Inter 6-2 Livorno on 23 February 1930
 Ambrosiana Inter 5-1 Livorno on 24 February 1935
 Inter 5-0 Livorno on 16 October 2005

The following table lists the history of meetings between Inter and Livorno, updated to the most recent match of 24 March 2010.

A.C. Milan 

 Most goals in a match
* More than 7 goals in single match
 11 goals on 6 November 1949 Inter 6-5 Milan
 9 goals on 3 April 1910 Inter 3-6 Milan
 9 goals on 6 November 1932 Inter 5-4 Milan
 8 goals on 6 February 1949 Inter 4-4 Milan
 8 goals on 27 March 1960 Milan 5-3 Inter
 7 goals on 22 February 1914 Inter 5-2 Milan
 7 goals on 28 March 1965 Inter 5-2 Milan
 7 goals on 28 October 2006 Milan 3-4 Inter

 AC Milan biggest wins
* Four or more goals difference, OR Milan scored five or above
 Inter 3-6 Milan on 3 April 1910
 Milan 5-3 Inter on 27 March 1960
 Milan 8-0 Inter on 8 January 1998 in Coppa Italia
 Inter 0-6 Milan on 11 May 2001

 F.C. Internazionale Milano biggest wins
* Four or more goals difference, OR Inter scored five or above
 Milan 0-5 Inter on 6 February 1910
 Inter 5-1 Milan on 17 February 1910
 Inter 5-2 Milan on 22 February 1914
 Ambrosiana Inter 5-4 Milan on 6 November 1932
 Inter 6-5 Milan on 6 November 1949
 Inter 5-2 Milan on 28 March 1965
 Inter 4-0 Milan on 2 April 1967
 Milan 1-5 Inter on 24 March 1974
 Milan 0-4 Inter on 29 August 2009

The following table lists the history of meetings between Inter and Milan, updated to the most recent derby of 14 November 2010.

S.S.C. Napoli 

 Most goals in a match
* More than 6 goals in single match
 11 goals on 19 December 1926 Inter 9-2 Napoli
 9 goals on 20 January 1929 Ambrosiana Inter 8-1 Napoli
 8 goals on 29 June 1933 Ambrosiana Inter 3-5 Napoli
 7 goals on 11 October 1931 Ambrosiana Inter 6-1 Napoli
 7 goals on 8 October 1950 Inter 4-3 Napoli
 7 goals on 10 February 1980 Napoli 3-4 Inter

 S.S.C. Napoli biggest wins
* Three or more goals difference OR Napoli scored than four goals
 Ambrosiana Inter 3-5 Napoli on 29 June 1933

 F.C. Internazionale Milano biggest wins
* Four or more goals difference, OR Inter scored five or above
 Inter 9-2 Napoli on 19 December 1926
 Ambrosiana Inter 8-1 Napoli on 20 January 1929
 Ambrosiana Inter 6-1 Napoli on 11 October 1931
 Ambrosiana Inter 5-1 Napoli on 21 December 1941
 Inter 5-1 Napoli on 5 October 1952
 Napoli 1-5 Inter 17 February 1963
 Inter 4-0 Napoli on 11 February 1996

The following table lists the history of meetings between Inter and Napoli, updated to the most recent match of 14 February 2010.

U.S. Città di Palermo 

 Most goals in a match
* More than 7 goals in single match
 8 goals on 29 October 2009 Inter 5-3 Palermo

 U.S. Città di Palermo biggest wins
* Two or more goals difference, OR Palermo scored three or above
 Palermo 4-2 Inter on 20 November 1949
 Palermo 3-2 Inter on 10 September 2005

 F.C. Internazionale Milano biggest wins
* Four or more goals difference, OR Inter scored five or above
 Ambrosiana Inter 5-1 Palermo on 8 January 1933
 Ambrosiana Inter 4-0 Palermo on 13 October 1935
 Inter 5-0 Palermo on 10 February 1952
 Inter 4-0 Palermo on 3 January 1954
 Inter 4-0 Palermo on 10 February 1963

The following table lists the history of meetings between Inter and Palermo, updated to the most recent match of 19 September 2010.

Parma F.C. 

 Most goals in a match
* More than 6 goals in single match
 7 goals on 29 November 2000 Parma 6-1 Inter in Coppa Italia
 6 goals on 19 September 1999 Inter 5-1 Parma

 Parma F.C. biggest wins
* Three or more goals difference OR Parma scored than four goals
 Parma 6-1 Inter on 29 November 2000 in Coppa Italia

 F.C. Internazionale Milano biggest wins
* Four or more goals difference, OR Inter scored five or above
 Inter 5-1 Parma on 19 September 1999

The following table lists the history of meetings between Inter and Parma, updated to the most recent match of 10 February 2010 .

Reggina Calcio 

 Most goals in a match
* More than 6 goals in single match
 6 goals on 29 August 1971 Inter 6-0 Reggina in Coppa Italia
 6 goals on 22 November 2003 Inter 6-0 Reggina

 Reggina Calcio biggest wins
 Reggina 2-1 Inter on 1 October 2000

 F.C. Internazionale Milano biggest wins
* Four or more goals difference, OR Inter scored five or above
 Inter 6-0 Reggina on 29 August 1971 in Coppa Italia
 Inter 6-0 Reggina on 22 November 2003
 Reggina 0-4 Inter on 18 December 2005
 Inter 4-0 Reggina on 22 April 2006

The following table lists the history of meetings between Inter and Reggina, updated to the most recent match of 22 March 2009.

A.S.Roma 

 Most goals in a match
* More than 7 goals in single match
 9 goals on 2 May 1999 Roma 4-5 Inter
 8 goals on 21 January 1968 Roma 2-6 Inter
 8 goals on 9 May 2007 Roma 6-2 Inter Coppa Italia
 7 goals on 7 April 1935 Roma 3-4 Ambrosiana Inter
 7 goals on 12 May 1985 Roma 4-3 Inter
 7 goals on 26 August 2006 Inter 4-3 Roma in Supercoppa Italiana

 AS Roma biggest wins
* Four or more goals difference, OR Roma scored five or above
 Roma 6-0 Ambrosiana Inter on 31 May 1942
 Roma 6-2 Inter on 9 May 2007 in Coppa Italia

 F.C. Internazionale Milano biggest wins
* Four or more goals difference, OR Inter scored five or above
 Ambrosiana Inter 6-0 Roma on 27 April 1930
 Ambrosiana Inter 5-0 Roma on 31 May 1931
 Ambrosiana Inter 5-1 Roma on 23 February 1936
 Ambrosiana Inter 5-1 Roma on 5 January 1941
 Inter 6-0 Roma on 22 October 1950
 Roma 2-6 Inter on 21 January 1968
 Roma 4-5 Inter on 2 May 1999

The following table lists the history of meetings between Inter and Roma, updated to the most recent match of 25 September 2010.

U.C. Sampdoria 

 Most goals in a match
* More than 7 goals in single match
 8 goals on 25 March 1956 Inter 7-1 Sampdoria
 8 goals on 9 January 1972 Inter 4-4 Sampdoria
 7 goals on 16 June 1957 Inter 6-1 Sampdoria
 7 goals on 15 December 1996 Inter 3-4 Sampdoria

 U.C. Sampdoria biggest wins
* Four or more goals difference, OR Sampdoria scored five or above
 Sampdoria 4-0 Inter on 22 September 1991
 Sampdoria 4-0 Inter on 21 March 1999

 F.C. Internazionale Milano biggest wins
* Four or more goals difference, OR Inter scored five or above
 Sampdoria 1-5 Inter on 6 July 1947
 Sampdoria 0-4 Inter on 9 January 1949
 Inter 5-1 Sampdoria on 5 November 1950
 Sampdoria 0-4 Inter on 18 March 1951
 Inter 7-1 Sampdoria on 25 March 1956
 Inter 6-1 Sampdoria on 16 June 1957
 Inter 5-1 Sampdoria on 23 November 1958
 Inter 4-0 Sampdoria on 18 November 1962
 Sampdoria 1-5 Inter on 1 March 1964
 Sampdoria 0-5 Inter on 19 December 1965
 Sampdoria 0-5 Inter on 26 April 1970
 Sampdoria 0-4 Inter on 13 April 2014

The following table lists the history of meetings between Inter and Sampdoria, updated to the most recent match of 24 October 2010.

A.C. Siena 

 Most goals in a match
* More than 6 goals in single match
 7 goals on 9 January 2010 Inter 4-3 Siena

 A.C. Siena biggest wins
* one or more goals difference
 None

 F.C. Internazionale Milano biggest wins
* Four or more goals difference, OR Inter scored five or above
 Inter 4-0 Siena on 1 February 2004

The following table lists the history of meetings between Inter and Siena, updated to the most recent match of 16 May 2010.

Torino F.C. 

 Most goals in a match
* More than 7 goals in single match
 12 goals on 7 March 1920 Torino 6-6 Inter
 10 goals on 12 January 1941 Torino 5-5 Ambrosiana Inter
 9 goals on 10 April 1910 Inter 7-2 Torino
 8 goals on 14 July 1946 Inter 6-2 Torino
 7 goals on 29 March 1925 Inter 2-5 Torino
 7 goals on 16 May 1926 Inter 3-4 Torino
 7 goals on 30 March 1947 Torino 5-2 Inter

 Torino F.C. biggest wins
* Four or more goals difference, OR Torino scored five or above
 Torino 6-0 Inter on 12 November 1921
 Torino 6-0 Ambrosiana Inter on 19 October 1930
 Torino 5-2 Inter on 30 March 1947

 F.C. Internazionale Milano biggest wins
* Four or more goals difference, OR Inter scored five or above
 Inter 7-2 Torino on 10 April 1910
 Ambrosiana Inter 5-1 Torino on 16 April 1933
 Ambrosiana Inter 4-0 Torino on 26 May 1935
 Ambrosiana Inter 4-0 Torino on 26 April 1936
 Ambrosiana Inter 5-1 Torino on 24 March 1940
 Inter 6-2 Torino on 14 July 1946
 Torino 0-5 Inter on 28 December 1958
 Inter 4-0 Torino on 17 October 1965
 Inter 4-0 Torino on 1 October 1995
 Inter 4-0 Torino on 9 December 2007

The following table lists the history of meetings between Inter and Torino, updated to the most recent match of 1 February 2009.

Udinese Calcio 

 Most goals in a match
* More than 7 goals in single match
 7 goals on 21 March 1951 Inter 6-1 Udinese
 7 goals on 29 April 1990 Udinese 4-3 Inter

 Udinese Calcio biggest wins
* Three or more goals difference, OR Udinese scored four or above
 Udinese 4-3 Inter on 29 April 1990
 Udinese 3-0 Inter on 9 April 2000
 Udinese 3-0 Inter on 21 October 2000

 F.C. Internazionale Milano biggest wins
* Four or more goals difference, OR Inter scored five or above
 Inter 6-1 Udinese on 21 March 1951
 Inter 5-0 Udinese on 1 February 1959
 Udinese 0-6 Inter on 9 October 1960

The following table lists the history of meetings between Inter and Udinese, updated to the most recent match of 11 September 2010.

INTER Archivio

League Record
Inter Milan